The Americas Zone was one of the three zones of the regional Davis Cup competition in 1992.

In the Americas Zone there were three different tiers, called groups, in which teams competed against each other to advance to the upper tier. Winners in Group III advanced to the Americas Zone Group II in 1992. All other teams remained in Group III.

Participating nations

Draw
 Venue: Maya Country Club, San Salvador, El Salvador
 Date: 19–22 March

Group A

Group B

  and  promoted to Group II in 1993.

Group A

El Salvador vs. Bolivia

Jamaica vs. Puerto Rico

El Salvador vs. Jamaica

Bolivia vs. Puerto Rico

El Salvador vs. Puerto Rico

Bolivia vs. Jamaica

Group B

Costa Rica vs. Guatemala

Haiti vs. Trinidad and Tobago

Costa Rica vs. Haiti

Guatemala vs. Trinidad and Tobago

Costa Rica vs. Trinidad and Tobago

Guatemala vs. Haiti

References

External links
Davis Cup official website

Davis Cup Americas Zone
Americas Zone Group III